A transverse arrowhead is a type of trapezoidal stone projectile point most commonly associated with the European Mesolithic and Neolithic periods although it is also found in other regions and periods.

Unlike a conventional arrowhead which tapers to a point, the transverse arrowhead usually widens to a cutting edge and was hafted onto an arrow shaft at its narrowest point. Other types have parallel sides but in any case transverse arrowheads are always wider than they are long.

Link to a page showing transverse spearheads in use in pre-dynastic Egypt.

References

Lithics
Projectile points
Archaeological artefact types